Afon Cefni was an iron, four-masted barque. She was named after Afon Cefni, one of the rivers of Anglesey. Like Afon Alaw, Afon Cefni was built in Glasgow, Scotland by A. Stephens & Sons for Hughes & Co from Menai Bridge, Anglesey.

The ship's career, however, was not long. In January 1894 it was en route to San Francisco from Swansea when it was lost with all crew. Later, pieces of the ship washed up on the Cornish and Sussex coasts.

Description

Service history
The barque was constructed by A. Stephens & Sons at their yard in Glasgow, Scotland on behalf of Hughes & Co with the yard number 339. The vessel was launched on 10 March 1892 and completed in April of that year. The ship was registered in Liverpool. Named Afon Cefni for the river in Anglesey, the barque had a short career.

On 5 January 1894, Afon Cefni departed Swansea, Wales for San Francisco, California. The vessel was last seen off Lundy and was not heard from again. From 20 January to 5 February pieces of wreckage from the ship were collected along the Cornish and Sussex coasts. The identity of the wreckage was ascertained when a lifebuoy bearing Afon Cefnis name washed up on the Sussex coast.

References

Transport in Wales
History of Anglesey
Economic history of Wales
1892 ships
Maritime incidents in 1894
Ships of Scotland